Timothy David Thomas Coak (born 16 January 1958) is an English retired professional footballer who played as a defender. A full-back who could play on the left or the right, Coak began his career with Southampton and later played for Salisbury City, Waterlooville, Gosport Borough, Bashley, Eastleigh, Aerostructures, Romsey Town and Fareham Town Veterans.

Career
Tim Coak initially joined the Southampton F.C. Academy as an apprentice in July 1974 at the age of 16, before signing professional terms in January 1976. He made his debut for the club on 26 April 1977 in a Football League Second Division match against Orient as a replacement for David Peach, who was away on national duty with the England under-21 side. Coak played a further five games for Southampton in the 1977–78 season, before leaving the club in 1979.

After leaving Southampton, Coak chose to play semi-professionally for a number of non-league sides in the Hampshire area: Salisbury City (1979–1982), Waterlooville (1982–1984), Gosport Borough (1984–1989 and 1989–1991), Bashley (1989), Eastleigh (1991–1992), Aerostructures (1992–1994), Romsey Town (1994–1995) and Fareham Town Veterans (1995). After retiring, he worked in a number of local coaching roles, as well as with the Southampton Centre of Excellence.

References

Bibliography

1958 births
Footballers from Southampton
Living people
English footballers
Association football defenders
Southampton F.C. players
Salisbury City F.C. players
Waterlooville F.C. players
Gosport Borough F.C. players
Bashley F.C. players
Eastleigh F.C. players
Folland Sports F.C. players
Romsey Town F.C. players